Between April 23–30, 1961, a tornado outbreak sequence struck the Midwest, Ohio, and Mississippi Valleys, and the Eastern United States. Large hailstorms accompanied the tornadoes as well and numerous other weather events also occurred. Three people were killed, 38 others were injured and losses totaled $26.810 million (1961 USD). Two additional fatalities also occurred due to flooding and lightning.

Meteorological synopsis
A series of at least two or three disturbances moved over the US over the timespan of nine days, starting with a strong weather system that came out of the Rocky Mountains on April 22. On April 23, multiple cells impacted the Midwest, with several strong, long-tracked tornadoes being reported, producing several casualties. On April 24, multiple clusters of severe thunderstorms formed over Oklahoma as well as South-Central and Southeastern Kansas. These storms produced multiple reports of wind and hail damage, power outages, funnel clouds, and a tornado. The storms congealed into a squall line that produced additional severe weather and tornadoes along with flash flooding through Missouri into West Virginia overnight into April 25. Following the squall line, a massive cluster of severe and tornadic thunderstorms with torrential downpours formed over Indiana and Tennessee and trekked eastward, producing massive amounts of damage and numerous casualties. General thunderstorms produced scattered activity during April 26-29 before another outbreak surged through the Great Plains on April 30, the final day of the sequence.

Confirmed tornadoes

April 23 event

April 24 event

April 25 event

April 26 event

April 27 event

April 28 event

April 29 event

April 30 event

Southern Marshalltown–Vinton–Center Point–Monticello, Iowa

This large, strong, long-tracked F3 tornado–which was most likely a tornado family–first touched down in Southern Marshalltown and immediately became strong, damaging numerous structures. The damage to the town alone was estimated at $1 million and eyewitnesses reported that tornado had more than one funnel as it passed through town. It first passed south of Garwin before crossing the Hinkle Creek directly into Garrison. It then struck the south side of Vinton before moving directly through Center Point and Alice. After crossing the Wapsipinicon River and striking the north side of Central City, it crossed Buffalo Creek, striking areas south of Prairiesburg. It was observed with a double funnel again as it passed by Monticello, one of four times this was reported during the tornado's lifespan. The tornado dissipated shortly after that.

One person was killed and 12 others were injured. Northwest Jones County saw an excessive amount of hail with up to  drifts in some areas.

Lorenzo–Peotone, Illinois/Belshaw–Roselawn, Indiana

This strong, destructive, long-tracked F3 tornado (which was also likely a tornado family) accompanied by a vicious hailstorm first touched down over Lorenzo, Illinois. It proceeded east-southeastward, immediately becoming strong and destroying seven homes in the town. It then crossed the Kankakee River and passed north of Wilmington, toppling a trailer truck. Passing north of Symerton and south of Wilton Center, the tornado continued to damage numerous homes and farmsteads as it moved through open country, before plowing into Peotone. 600 homes were damaged by both the tornado and the massive hail that fell with it. One hailstone was reportedly  in diameter, although this was never verified. The Peotone Airport was hit hard as 21 planes were damaged by hail alone, with most being completely totaled beyond repair. All four injuries from the tornado occurred in Peotone when a house trailer was rolled. The tornado then weakened and may have briefly lifted as it passed halfway between Beecher and Polk before abruptly turning southeastward as it entered Indiana on a non-continuous damage path. Throughout Illinois, the tornado injured four and caused $2.5 million in damage.

As the tornado touched downed again in Indiana, more large hail began to fall. The tornado passed west of North Hayden located west of Lowell, Indiana before causing the heaviest damage in the state near Belshaw at the intersection of US 41 and SR 2. Here the tornado damaged multiple farm buildings and toppled 30 billboards along US 41. The tornado then passed west of Shelby and Thayer before dissipating just outside of Roselawn. The tornado did F2 damage at its peak in Indiana with losses totaling $250,000.

There were four injuries.

Marion–Waterloo–Boston, Indiana/Eaton, Ohio

Four funnel clouds consolidated into this long-tracked, violent, skipping multi-vortex F4 tornado–which may have been tornado family of at least two tornadoes. It first touched down in Shelby County, Indiana northwest of Shelbyville along I-74 and immediately became violent, tossing a loaded truck . A total of 10 homes and 21 barns were destroyed, and 11 other homes were badly damaged. One person was injured and losses totaled $2.5 million in the area.

The tornado then continued into rural areas of Rush County, where 15 homes were badly damaged. North of Rushville, multiple trucks were rolled or flipped, injuring three. Homes and buildings south of the town of Gings were also badly damaged and losses in the county reached $2.5 million.

In Fayette County, the tornado moved through mostly rural areas before passing through the three-town trio of Harrisburg, Huber and Waterloo. Waterloo was the hardest hit as multiple homes and buildings were destroyed. Three homes and two mobile homes were obliterated throughout the county before the tornado clipped the northwest side of Union County, passing south of Philomath and Abington. Damage in both counties reached $2.5 million.

Some of the most extreme damage occurred as the tornado entered Wayne County and struck the town of Boston. Two homes and a mobile home were obliterated and three people in one of the homes were injured, one seriously. Heavy damage occurred along the roads heading in and out of town before the tornado moved into Ohio. Losses in Wayne County reached $2.5 million.

The tornado then turned almost due east as it moved into rural Preble County, Ohio. Nonetheless, the tornado remained strong to violent. It first struck the town of West Florence, heavily damaging or partially destroying multiple farmhouses and barns. As the tornado entered the west side of Eaton, another farmhouse was obliterated and swept away, although a ring of trees around the home were incredibly left undamaged. A nearby barn was also obliterated and an adjacent housing development of brand new homes was badly damaged. The tornado then weakened, but remained strong as it entered Eaton, damaging a grove of trees as well as the roof of an office buildings and stores. The tornado then weakened further as it continued through the central part of Eaton, causing only light to minor damage to treetops and roofs and breaking windows before finally dissipating on the east side of town. Damage in Ohio reached $2.5 million.

Seven people were injured and losses totaled $12.5 million in damage.

Non-tornadic impacts
Numerous reports of strong winds and large hail were recorded throughout the event. The complex of storms that moved through Ohio on April 25 produced a  wind gust southeast of Burtonville.

Flash flooding was also a major issue throughout the event and one man did drown after being caught flood waters caused by Adens Creek in Ohio. Heavy rainfall also caused flash flooding and numerous accidents in Southeastern Kansas on April 30, injuring one.

Lightning was a surprisingly destructive and deadly catalyst during the event. Overnight during April 24-25, multiple lightning strikes across Southern Michigan triggered several fires that seriously damaged homes, destroyed a barn, and caused power outages in both Ann Arbor and Flint. In an extreme case on April 26, static electricity caused by intense lightning strikes caused a premature explosion of a 5-lb. charge of dynamite in a water tunnel that was under construction in Northboro, Massachusetts. One person was killed and 11 others were injured, three seriously, with one man losing his arm.

In Northeastern Montana, rain turned to snow, and high winds from the evening of April 22 into April 23. Since it was heavy, wet snow, it froze up on power lines overnight, leading to widespread power outages.

High winds on the back side of the first system on April 23 caused heavy damage to crops in Southeastern Wyoming, Northwestern Nebraska, and Northeastern Colorado. Greeley, Colorado was especially hard hit as a factory lost approximately 600 acres of sugar beets.

See also
 List of North American tornadoes and tornado outbreaks

Notes

References

Tornadoes of 1961
F4 tornadoes
Tornadoes in the United States
Tornadoes in Missouri
Tornadoes in Iowa
Tornadoes in Illinois
Tornadoes in Indiana
Tornadoes in Texas
Tornadoes in Oklahoma
Tornadoes in Kansas
Tornadoes in West Virginia
Tornadoes in Ohio
Tornadoes in Tennessee
Tornadoes in Connecticut
Tornadoes in Alabama
Tornadoes in Delaware